(caretaker)
Åge Fridtjof Hareide (born 23 September 1953) is a Norwegian football manager and player, currently managing Malmö FF as the interim manager. In his playing career, he played for Hødd and Molde in Norway as well as Manchester City and Norwich City in England. Hareide was capped 50 times playing for Norway.

As a coach, Hareide has won league titles in all of the Scandinavian countries, In Sweden with Helsingborgs IF in 1999 and with Malmö FF in 2014, in Denmark with Brøndby in 2001–02 and in his native Norway with Rosenborg in 2003. Hareide was in charge of the Norway national team from 2003 to 2008. While at Malmö during his first time in charge at the club, he notably took the team to the modern-day UEFA Champions League group stages for the first two times in the club's history.

Playing career
During his playing career, Hareide played for Hødd, Molde, Manchester City and Norwich City.

He was also an active player for the Norway national team from 1976 through 1986, scoring five goals in 50 matches.

Coaching career
As a coach Hareide has won three European countries' national league championships, namely that of Denmark, Sweden and his native Norway, making him the only coach to have won the league in three Scandinavian countries. Other coaches who have won league titles in three countries include fellow Scandinavians Trond Sollied and Sven-Göran Eriksson, while Ernst Happel, Giovanni Trapattoni, José Mourinho and Carlo Ancelotti have won championships in four countries.

Early managerial career
In the mid-1990s, Norwegian millionaires Kjell Inge Røkke and Bjørn Rune Gjelsten were reportedly interested in bringing Hareide back to Manchester City as manager if their bid to take over the club was successful, but the takeover bid failed and Hareide never returned to the club. When the pair tried to take over Leeds United around the same time, it was once again reported that Hareide would be installed as manager if the takeover bid succeeded, but this bid too failed and Hareide was never put in charge at Elland Road. However, the pair finally succeeded in a takeover bid for fellow English Premier League club Wimbledon in June 1997, and Hareide appeared all set to become the new manager of the club in a move that would have ousted the incumbent Joe Kinnear. But this never happened either.

Norway
Hareide was employed as the coach of the Norway national football team at the end of 2003, replacing Nils Johan Semb, after one season as coach of Rosenborg BK. On 8 December 2008, after having failed to take Norway to any international tournaments, and having had a bad start to the 2010 FIFA World Cup qualifying campaign, Hareide resigned from his position as national team coach of Norway. On 9 December 2008 Hareide announced that he was stepping down as coach of the Norway national team.

Viking
On 10 June 2009 it was announced that he wouldbe coaching Örgryte IS. On 1 December 2009 the former Norway national team head coach left the Swedish club to join Viking FK, from Stavanger to replace Uwe Rösler. Following Egil Østenstad resignation as director of football in Viking, Viking announced in September 2011 that Hareide would be manager of Viking, and that Josep Clotet Ruiz would be hired as coach from the 2012-season onwards, similar to the organization English clubs and Molde have, with Ole Gunnar Solskjær as manager and Mark Dempsey as coach. Viking finished 9th in 2010, Hareide's first season, and 11th in 2011. With the team positioned on 10th place on 9 June 2012, Hareide was released by Viking FK because of the bad results.

Second spell at Helsingborg
Following Conny Karlsson's resignation in Helsingborgs IF, the club hired Hareide, the last coach who won Allsvenskan with Helsingborgs IF, except Karlsson, as head coach until the end of the 2012 season.

Malmö FF
Hareide was brought out of retirement from his managerial career by being appointed as the new manager of the reigning Swedish champions Malmö FF on 9 January 2014. He had immediate success at the club as he led the team to defend their Allsvenskan title and qualify for the group stage of the 2014–15 UEFA Champions League in his first season. For this successful season Hareide was awarded Allsvenskan manager of the year. He was also nominated for coach of the year at Svenska idrottsgalan.

Denmark
On 10 December 2015, Hareide was announced as the new manager of the Denmark national football team replacing Morten Olsen, who had stepped down following the UEFA Euro 2016 qualification. Hareide began his new job on 1 March 2016. In November 2017, he managed his Denmark team to qualification for the 2018 FIFA World Cup in Russia. This was achieved with a 5-1 aggregate play-off win over Ireland.

Hareide was the Danish coach at the 2018 FIFA World Cup. He managed Denmark to 2nd place in their group before they were eliminated in the round of 16 in a penalty shootout against Croatia.

Hareide continued as manager of in the UEFA Euro 2020 qualifying. Under his leadership Denmark qualified for the UEFA Euro 2020. It was revealed that Kasper Hjulmand would replace him as manager of the Danish team following the tournament. However, due to the COVID-19 pandemic the tournament was postponed, and Hareide's contract expired. When he left he had not lost for the last 34 games, and his last defeat was on 11 October 2016 against Montenegro.

Rosenborg
In August 2020, he became the head coach of Rosenborg BK for a second tenure. In june 2021, Åge revealed his opposition to LGBT pride

Malmö FF
In September 2022, Åge was announced as the new interim manager for Malmö FF.

Media career
He resigned as the Norway national team coach then worked as an expert Norwegian Premier League commentator for the Norwegian Broadcasting Corporation.

Statistics

Playing career

Managerial career

1 Only competitive matches are counted.
2 For these earlier statistics, only league matches are collected.

Honours

Manager
Molde FK
Norwegian Football Cup: 1994

Helsingborgs IF
Allsvenskan: 1999
Svenska Cupen: 1997–98

Brøndby IF
Danish Superliga: 2001–02

Rosenborg BK
Tippeligaen: 2003
Norwegian Football Cup: 2003

Malmö FF
Allsvenskan: 2014
Svenska Supercupen: 2014

Individual
Allsvenskan Manager of the Year: 2014

References

External links

Malmö FF profile 

1953 births
Living people
People from Hareid
Norwegian footballers
Norway international footballers
Norwegian football managers
Eliteserien players
Norwegian First Division players
IL Hødd players
Molde FK players
Manchester City F.C. players
Norwich City F.C. players
English Football League players
Molde FK managers
Helsingborgs IF managers
Brøndby IF managers
Rosenborg BK managers
Malmö FF managers
Norway national football team managers
Örgryte IS managers
Viking FK managers
Denmark national football team managers
Norwegian expatriate footballers
Expatriate footballers in England
Norwegian expatriate sportspeople in England
Norwegian expatriate football managers
Expatriate football managers in Sweden
Norwegian expatriate sportspeople in Sweden
Expatriate football managers in Denmark
Norwegian expatriate sportspeople in Denmark
Kniksen Award winners
Sports commentators
Association football defenders
2018 FIFA World Cup managers
Eliteserien managers
Allsvenskan managers
Danish Superliga managers
Sportspeople from Møre og Romsdal